The 31st Luna Awards were held on June 1, 2013 at the Quezon City Sports Club and they honored the best Filipino films of the year 2012.

The list of nominations were released on May 3, 2013. The Mistress received nominations in eleven out of twelve categories, only missing in the production design category. One More Try followed with eight.

Both The Mistress and El Presidente dominated the ceremony. The former garnered six awards while the latter won five awards, including the Best Picture.

Winners and nominees

Special awards

Multiple nominations and awards

References

External links
 Official Website of the Film Academy of the Philippines

Luna Awards
2013 film awards